Deleted in bladder cancer protein 1 is a protein that in humans is encoded by the DBC1 gene.

This gene is located within chromosome 9 (9q32-33), a chromosomal region that frequently shows loss of heterozygosity in transitional cell carcinoma of the bladder.  It contains a 5' CpG island that may be a frequent target of hypermethylation, and it may undergo hypermethylation-based silencing in some bladder cancers.

The functions of this gene are unknown, and it has not yet been placed in a protein family or functional pathway. Nonetheless, it is suspected to act as a tumor suppressor gene.

References

Further reading